Chapulhuacán (Otomi: Mät’äxi) is a town and one of the 84 municipalities of Hidalgo, in central-eastern Mexico. The municipality covers an area of 239 km².

As of 2005, the municipality had a total population of 20,577. In 2012 there were 1,758 inhabitants who spoke an indigenous language, primarily Nahuatl.

References

Municipalities of Hidalgo (state)
Populated places in Hidalgo (state)